Peel Sessions is a compilation album of live BBC radio sessions by Galaxie 500.

Track listing 
All songs written by Galaxie 500 except as noted.
 "Submission" (Sex Pistols) – 4:10
 "Final Day" (Young Marble Giants) – 2:54
 "When Will You Come Home" – 5:11
 "Moonshot" (Buffy Sainte-Marie) – 3:21
 "Flowers" – 4:39
 "Blue Thunder" – 3:49
 "Decomposing Trees" – 4:04
 "Don't Let Our Youth Go to Waste" (Jonathan Richman) – 6:48

References

External links 
Lyrics and Tablature

Galaxie 500 albums
Peel Sessions recordings
2005 live albums
2005 compilation albums